Max Emanuel Stern (9 November 1811 – 9 February 1873), also known as Mendel b'ri Stern, was a Hungarian-born Hebraist, writer, poet, and translator.

Biography
Born to Jewish parents in Presburg in 1811, Stern first studied under his father Isak, who was a teacher at the local Jewish primary school. When his father became blind, Max, then only fourteen years of age, took charge of his classes, devoting his nights to further study and to writing his Dichtungen, his Maslul, and his Perlenblumen, the latter being metrical translations of the Proverbs. His poems first appeared in print in 1827. Stern held the teaching position for nine years, resigning upon his father's death in late 1832.

The following year he accepted the position of literary advisor and proofreader for Anton Edler von Schmid's printing press at Vienna. He was appointed principal of the Hebrew-German school at Eisenstadt in 1835, where he wrote his epic Tif'ereth ha-Tishbi, a biography of the prophet Elijah in two parts. In 1838, after having taught for half a year at Triesch, he returned to Vienna, where he prepared his epic for the press, publishing it under the pseudonym of "M. I. Ernst" (Leipzig, 1840). He meanwhile became known to wider circles through translations of prayers and philosophical writings.

Stern began in 1845 to publish his Hebrew periodical  ('Stars of Isaac'; 36 volumes, 1845–69), which included poetry, prose, scholarly articles, and translations, and was twice subsidized by the Imperial Academy of Science at Vienna.

In the last years of his life, he made his living from the production of Hebrew funerary writings and occasional poems.

Bibliography

 
  Rhymed metrical translation of the Proverbs.
  Grammar of the Hebrew language.
 
  Interlinear translation of the Proverbs.
  Translation of Lamentations, Zionides, and kinnot.
  Epic poem in eight cantos.
  Elegy on the death of Moses Sofer.
  Rhymed metrical translation of Pirkei Avot.
 
 
  Translation of Selichot.
  Translation of Ezekiel.
  
 
 
 
 
 
  Hebrew translation of Ludwig August Frankl's Rachel.
  Hebrew translation of M. G. Saphir's Der verkaufte Schlaf.
  Translation of Jedaiah ben Abraham Bedersi's Beḥinat ha-'Olam.
 
  Translation of the Book of Wisdom from Naphtali Hirz Wessely's Hebrew.
  Translation of Baḥya ibn Pakuda's Ḥovot ha-levavot.
  Rhymed metrical translation of the Haggadah.
 
  Satire on the choice of rabbi for Vienna after the death of Manheimer.
 
  Poem in Hebrew and German on the opening of a Temple by Franz Joseph I.
  Translation of Ludwig August Frankl's Nach Jerusalem.
  German translation of Ḥananya ben Yitzḥak's Musre ha-filosofim.
  Dictionary of Aramaic words found in the Talmud.
  Poetic description of the 613 commandments.
  Translation of Immanuel the Roman's Ha-Tofet veha-Eden.
  Hebrew-German dictionary.

References

External links
 
 

1811 births
1873 deaths
Austro-Hungarian educators
Austro-Hungarian Jews
Austro-Hungarian poets
Austro-Hungarian writers
Epic poets
Hebrew–German translators
Jewish educators
Jewish translators
People from the Kingdom of Hungary
Print editors
Recipients of the Order of Franz Joseph
Slovak Jews
Writers from Bratislava